Liturgical colours are specific colours used for vestments and hangings within the context of Christian liturgy. The symbolism of violet, blue, white, green, red, gold, black, rose and other colours may serve to underline moods appropriate to a season of the liturgical year or may highlight a special occasion.

There is a distinction between the colour of the vestments worn by the clergy and their choir dress, which with a few exceptions does not change with the seasons of the liturgical year.

Roman Catholic Church

Current rubrics
In the Roman Rite, as reformed by Pope Paul VI, the following colours are used, in accordance with the rubrics of the General Instruction of the Roman Missal, Section 346.

On more solemn days, i.e. festive, more precious, sacred vestments may be used, even if not of the colour of the day. Such vestments may, for instance, be made from cloth of gold or cloth of silver. Moreover, the Conference of Bishops may determine and propose to the Apostolic See adaptations suited to the needs and culture of peoples.

Ritual Masses are celebrated in their proper colour or in white or in a festive colour. Masses for Various Needs, on the other hand, are celebrated in the colour proper to the day or the season or in violet if they bear a penitential character. Votive Masses are celebrated in the colour suited to the Mass itself or even in the colour proper to the day or the season.

Regional and situational exceptions 
Some particular variations:
 Blue, a colour associated with the Virgin Mary. While blue vestments are common in some Eastern churches, in the Latin rite, blue may only be used pursuant to a special privilege granted. The permission, sometimes called "cerulean privilege", is of two kinds: one pertains to particular Marian shrines and specifies when blue vestments may be worn. The other type of permission is that accorded to various countries. An apostolic indult was granted for the feast of the Immaculate Conception and its octave as well as for votive masses and Saturdays, when the Office the Immaculate Conception is prayed and on Marian feasts where there is a related custom. The privilege has been granted to Spain, to certain of its colonies, and former colonies in Latin America by a decree of the Sacred Congregation of Rites on 12 February 1864. It also extends to the Philippines, Guam, and the Marianna Islands which were still under Spanish rule at that time. There have also been uses of blue in place of violet for the season of Advent despite the fact that this practice is not authorized under liturgical rubrics.
 Gold or  silver may be worn on more solemn occasions in the dioceses of the United States.

1960 rubrics
The rules on liturgical colours in the 1960 Code of Rubrics, whose observance is still permitted in the circumstances indicated in the 2007 document Summorum Pontificum on use of the 1962 Roman Missal, which incorporates them, differ from the current rubrics in the following respects:

Pope Pius X raised the rank of the Sundays after Epiphany and Pentecost, so that on those that fell within common octaves, green was used instead of the colour of the octave, as had previously been the rule; on Sundays after Pentecost that fell within privileged octaves (i.e., the octaves of Corpus Christi and of the Sacred Heart), the liturgical color of the feast was retained.

The rules on liturgical colours before the time of Pope Pius X were essentially those indicated in the edition of the Roman Missal that Pope Pius V promulgated in 1570, except for the addition of feasts not included in his Missal. The scheme of colours in his Missal reflected usage that had become fixed in Rome by the twelfth century.

Byzantine Rite
The Byzantine Rite, which is used by all the member churches of the Eastern Orthodox Church, the Byzantine Lutheran Churches and the Eastern Catholic Churches of Byzantine Rite, does not have a universal system of colours, with the service-books of the Byzantine tradition only specifying "light" or "dark" vestments in the service books. In the Greek tradition, maroon or burgundy are common for solemn feast days, and a wide variety of colours are used at other times, the most common of which are gold and white.

Slavic-use churches and others influenced by Western traditions have adopted a cycle of liturgical colours.  The particulars may change from place to place, but generally:

The colours would be changed before Vespers on the eve of the day being commemorated.  During Great Feasts, the colour is changed before the vespers service that begins the first day of a forefeast, and remains until the apodosis (final day of the afterfeast).

Under Western influence, black is often used in the Slavic churches for funerals, weekdays of Great Lent, and Holy Week as a sign of penance and mourning, but in the second half of the 20th century, the ancient white became more common, as a sign of the hope of the Resurrection.

Russian liturgical colours
In the tradition of the Russian Orthodox Church, up to nine different liturgical colours may be used throughout the year.
Exact use of these colours varies, but the following are the most common uses:

Coptic Rite
The Coptic tradition, followed by the Coptic Orthodox Church and the Coptic Catholic Church, only uses white vestments, with gold and silver being considered variations of white. The only exception is during Passion Week when black is used. Nonetheless, trimmings of red, gold or blue may be found on some vestments.

Ethiopian Rite
The liturgical tradition of Ethiopia, followed by the Ethiopian Orthodox Church and the Ethiopian Catholic Church, embraces a wide variety of liturgical colours. In Eritrea, similar traditions are followed.

Lutheran churches
The Evangelical Lutheran Church in America (ELCA), uses a similar colour scheme as that of the Anglicans and their Scandinavian Lutheran counterparts, with the use of gold only for the Easter Vigil and Easter Sunday services and Holy Week using scarlet rather than crimson. Blue is used for Advent. White is used for Christmas, Epiphany, Sundays of Easter, Holy Trinity, and Christ the King. For Lent, purple is used. During the time after Pentecost and the Epiphany, green is used. 

Both the Lutheran Church–Missouri Synod (LCMS) and the Wisconsin Evangelical Lutheran Synod (WELS) use a similar system, but with purple being the primary colour for both Advent and Lent (with blue being the alternate colour for Advent only), and the use of gold in place of white for both Christmas and Easter (in similar practice to the Catholic Church).  In the WELS, the use of red is also done during the Period of End Times, a period of the Church regarding the teachings of the Book of Revelation, culminating in the creation of the New Jerusalem (corresponding to Christ the King in the ELCA). In all three churches, including the ELCA, red is also worn on the last Sunday of October, in celebration of the Reformation on October 31, when Martin Luther nailed the 95 Theses onto the door of Wittenberg Castle Church.

Anglicanism

Most Anglican churches use the colours appointed in the Roman Rite, usually in its post-1969 form, with the exception of Sarum Blue replacing violet for Advent, but some use the earlier form, with, for instance, black in place of red on Good Friday. Some churches use black at Masses for the dead, but more commonly white or purple is used. For historical reasons much of the worldwide Anglican Communion takes a noticeable lead from the practice of the Church of England. Since the 1980 Alternative Service Book, liturgical colours have been recommended for seasons, with more detailed advice offered as part of the Common Worship series of liturgies, including colours for all Sundays and festivals printed in the 'core volume' next to collects.

The Church's published Lectionary now makes detailed suggestions for liturgical colour throughout the year, which corresponds almost exactly with the above table of Roman Rite (post-1969 usage) usage with five minor exceptions, and one more significant one:

 there is no reference in Anglican usage to Masses of deceased popes and cardinals;
 no liturgical colour at all is suggested for Holy Saturday (the words "hangings removed" are printed);
 the recommendation of red for confirmation rites is extended also to ordination rites;
 Lenten Array (unbleached linen) continues to be listed as an alternative option to purple during Lent;
 the option exists for using red instead of green during the "Kingdom Season", the four last Sundays of the liturgical year, culminating in Christ the King, as is common is some Lutheran traditions (see below);
 finally, and more significantly, the Church of England provision suggests white throughout the Sundays after Epiphany as a distinct "Epiphany season", with ordinary time commencing the day after Candlemas.

The colour scheme suggested by the Church of England also indicates where gold vestments should be used in those churches that possess gold and white as distinct colours. The use of rose-pink vestments, as in the Roman Rite table above, was mentioned as an option in early editions of Common Worship, and is a listed option in the annual published lectionary; however, later Common Worship publications have begun to refer to this practice as "traditional" reflecting its resurgence.

Sarum Rite
The Sarum Rite was a medieval liturgical rite used in England before the Reformation which had a distinct set of liturgical colours. After the Anglo-Catholic Revival of the 19th century, certain Church of England churches began adopting Sarum liturgical colours as an attempt to produce something that was an English expression of Catholicism rather than a Roman expression. One of the chief advocates behind this was Percy Dearmer. The exact colours used by the mediaeval Sarum rite are a matter of dispute, but colours adopted by contemporary churches claiming to use the Sarum scheme include in particular deep blue for Advent, which may be popularly referred to as "Sarum blue", and unbleached linen for Lent. The Sarum rite has never received official approval in the Church of England or Episcopal Church (United States), but has influenced a number of cathedrals and parish churches.

Methodist churches
Methodists use a colour scheme similar to those used by Lutherans and Roman Catholics. The United Methodist Church, prior to the early-1990s, used red solely for Pentecost, even including the Sundays after Pentecost Sunday, with the use of green being reserved for the season of Kingdomtide, which usually lasted from late August/early September until Christ the King (the last Sunday in Kingdomtide). Since the publication of the 1992 Book of Worship, the UMC has followed the ELCA practice of wearing red only for Pentecost, Holy Week and Reformation Sunday and green for the rest of the Pentecost season.

Reformed churches
The Presbyterian Church (USA), or its predecessor denominations, has sanctioned the use of liturgical colours and promoted their use in The Worshipbook of 1970, the 1993 Book of Common Worship and the 2018 Book of Common Worship. Advent and Lent are periods of preparation and repentance and are represented by the colour purple. The feasts of Christmas Day and Christmastide, Epiphany Sunday, Baptism of the Lord Sunday, Transfiguration Sunday, Easter Season, Trinity Sunday, and Christ the King Sunday are represented by white. Green is the colour for periods of Ordinary Time. Red is for Pentecost Sunday, but may also be used for ordinations, church anniversaries, and memorial services for ordained clergy. Red or purple are appropriate for Palm Sunday. During Holy Week, purple is used until the church is stripped bare on Maundy Thursday; the church remains stripped bare on Good Friday and Holy Saturday, though in some places black might be used on those days.

Similarly, the United Church of Christ includes indications of which liturgical colour to use for each Sunday in its annual calendar. The general Western pattern is followed, with either purple or blue recommended for Advent.

References

Bibliography

External links
 Christian Symbols, Crosses, Parament Colours; and their meanings—Trinity Lutheran Church, Billings, Montana
 Liturgical Colours, from Chuck Knows Church, a ministry of the General Board of Discipleship of The United Methodist Church
 Clergy Stoles and their Colors a related video to the above, from Chuck Knows Church, a ministry of the General Board of Discipleship of The United Methodist Church  
 
 Protestant liturgical colours on-line
 Catholic calendar showing the liturgical colours for each day and feast

Catholic liturgy
Color
Color codes
Mass (liturgy)
Liturgical calendar
Color of clothing
Color in religion